Christopher Ekka is an Indian politician. He was elected to the Lok Sabha, the lower house of the Parliament of India from Sundargarh, Odisha as a member of the Indian National Congress.

References

External links
Official Biographical Sketch in Lok Sabha Website

Living people
1943 births
Lok Sabha members from Odisha
India MPs 1980–1984
Indian National Congress politicians
Indian National Congress politicians from Odisha